Kenya–Singapore relations are bilateral relations between Kenya and Singapore. Both countries are members of the Commonwealth of Nations.

History
President Kenyatta visited Singapore in September 2019 for the Singapore Summit. He also met and held talks with Prime Minister Lee Hsien Loong. Both leaders signed a few agreements including:
FinTech Cooperation Agreement - to support digital infrastructure development in Kenya
Bilateral Investment Treaty

Trade
Total trade is approximately KES. 6.1 billion (US$61.3 million) S$85.4 million in 2017.

Kenya exported goods worth KES. 1 billion (US$10 million) S$13.9 million to Singapore. Singapore exported goods worth KES. 5.16 billion (US$51.3 million) S$71.4 million.

Kenya's main exports to Singapore include: tea, fruits, nuts and vegetables.

Singapore's main exports to Kenya include: synthetic fibers and polymers.

Enterprise Singapore opened its 3rd Sub-Saharan Africa office in Nairobi in 2018.

Diplomatic missions
Kenya's high commission in New Delhi is accredited to Singapore. Singapore's mission to Kenya is based in Singapore.

See also
 Foreign relations of Kenya
 Foreign relations of Singapore

References

 
Singapore
Bilateral relations of Singapore